Mystery Show is a Gimlet Media podcast hosted by Starlee Kine that ran for one season in 2015. In each episode, Kine solves a minor mystery which cannot be solved with search engines alone. It was declared the best new podcast of 2015 by iTunes.

Mysteries tackled by the show include the closing of a video rental store and the origins of a peculiar custom belt buckle. During the investigations, Kine frequently veers from the original topic, asking subjects about more personal and philosophical matters.

In October 2016, Kine announced though a Medium post and the show's Facebook page that she was no longer working at Gimlet Media and that the network would not be producing a second season of Mystery Show.

Episodes

Reception
Apple named Mystery Show the Best New Podcast of 2015 in their year-end awards.

Episode 3 of Season 1, "Belt Buckle", was ranked #1 on The Atlantics list of the top 50 podcast episodes of 2015, with their summary stating that "the episode is unrelenting in its playfulness and joy, but a sense of profundity lies just beneath the surface, bobbing up in the final minutes, when you won't be sure whether to grin or weep". The show has continued to garner acclaim over the years despite not publishing new episodes since 2015; in 2021, The New York Times praised the show as “utterly captivating”  and in 2022, The Guardian described the series as a “podcast classic”.

Hiatus 
After the conclusion of Season 1, no new episodes were released. A January update posted to the show's Facebook page stated that Season 2 was "in the works".

In October 2016, Kine published an update to Medium and to the Mystery Show Facebook page saying that she had been let go from Gimlet Media in April 2016, during the early stages of Season 2's production. The same day, Gimlet published a blog post stating that Mystery Show was "unsustainable to produce and publish on a consistent basis, and therefore Gimlet will no longer produce new episodes of Mystery Show. We are in discussions with Starlee to reach an agreement where she may produce Mystery Show independently of Gimlet."

References

External links
  at Gimlet Media

Audio podcasts
2015 podcast debuts
Gimlet Media
2015 podcast endings
American podcasts